Ali e radici (Wings and Roots), also known by its Spanish name Alas y raíces, is a 2009 studio album by Italian singer-songwriter Eros Ramazzotti.

Four years after the issue of his last studio album and two years after his (best of) compilation album, Eros circulates his new studio album with the title "Ali e radici", which consists of eleven songs. His new album is available in a standard edition as well as in a deluxe edition (the latter includes 64-page booklet of photographs). Eros is the producer of the album with Claudio Guidetti. Michele Canova (who is Tiziano Ferro and Giusy Ferreri's producer) is the co-producer of the six songs of the album. Moreover, Michele Canova writes the music with Eros and Claudio Guidetti and the lyrics with Eros and Adelio Cogliati. The first single from the album is "Parla con me".

Track listing

Ali e radici

Alas y raíces

Charts

Weekly charts

Year-end charts

Certifications

Reception
 allmusic

References

2009 albums
Eros Ramazzotti albums
Albums produced by Michele Canova